Palluruthy is a region in the city of Kochi, in the state of Kerala, India. Palluruthy is part a of the water bound West Kochi, lying westward to the Kochi mainland. Palluruthy comprises the regions Thoppumpady, Perumpadappu, Edakochi, Mundamveli and Kumbalanghi. The place is famous for its temples landscapes, backwaters and lotus pond. A historical trade fair called Pulavanibham is held every year at Palluruthy during the Malayalam month Dhanu.

Facilities
There are many Hindu temples like Sree Bhavaneeswara Temple and Azhakiyakavu Bhagavathi Temple. Sree Bhavaneeswara Temple, in the city was established by Sree Narayana Guru on 8 March 1916.

It has Muslim Mosques like Thangal Nagar Muhammed Palli, Nambiapuram Mosque, Salafi Juma Masjid etc. and Christian churches like St. Sebastians Church and St. Thomas Moore Church. 

Kumbalanghi is a well-known tourist spot (model tourism village) nearby. Palluruthy does not have many problems with mosquito and waste disposal when compared to other parts of Cochin. It is also known for its religious unity. 

Palluruthy Relief Settlement is a shelter for wayside beggars and homeless people.  Snehabhavan is an orphanage in Palluruthy.

There are several prestigious schools in Palluruthy such as St. Sebastians High School, S.D.P.Y. school. Other schools are Auxilium ICSE EMHS run by Salesian Sisters, St. Dominics EMHS run by Dominican Sisters, St. Juliana's CBSE School, St. Aloysius ISC School, St. Ritas CBSE School, and Chinmaya Vidyalaya CBSE School.

Notable residents
Birthplace of Malayalam actors Sreenath bhasi, Sudhi Koppa, Gourav Menon, Sajan palluruthy, Music composer Arjunan master and Singer Pradeep palluruthy.

Location

See also
Pulavanibham

Reference

Neighbourhoods in Kochi